The Opportunities Party (usually referred to as TOP) is a centrist political party based in New Zealand. It was founded in 2016 by economist and philanthropist Gareth Morgan and is today led by Raf Manji. The party is based upon an idea of "evidence-based policy", with policy priorities of "Universal Basic Income (UBI)", "Affordable Housing and Rent", "Smart Small Business", and "Climate Friendly Recovery".

The party received 2.4% of the party vote in the 2017 general election, after which Morgan left the party. It received 1.5% of the party vote in the 2020 general election. The party won elected office for the first time in the 2022 New Zealand local elections, with one member elected to the Featherston Community Board in the South Wairarapa District.

Policies and principles 
TOP lists its policies on its website. For the upcoming 2023 New Zealand general election, these include:

Fiscal policy

Phase 1 

 Restructure the current tax bracket to include a tax-free threshold on income up to $15,000, a 20% income tax rate for income between $15,000 and $80,000, a 35% income tax rate for income between $80,000 and $180,000 and a 39% income tax rate for income beyond $180,000.
 Introduce a land value tax (LVT) of 0.75% on urban residential land; excluding rural, conservation and Māori land while offering to superannuants to defer payment until a change in ownership of their property. This tax is designed to decrease land speculation, offset the tax cuts on income in doing so shift the burden on taxation on land and not work.
 Remove hurdles in accessing benefits, such as your relationship status determining benefit allowances.
 Increase income support for people with disabilities by $400 million and streamline the process of accessing that support.
 Cancel Ministry of Social Development debt.
 Extend the In-Work Tax Credit to all children of low-income families ($500 million).

Phase 2 

 Replace the Jobseeker Support with a universal basic income (UBI) of $16,500 per year for all adults above the age of 18 and 65; and to the parents of children under 18, an additional UBI of $2,340.
 Expand the aforementioned income tax bracket to companies and trusts, and replace it with a 35% flat tax rate.
 Increase the LVT rate to 1.25%

Housing policy 

 Remove the current Bright Line Test and allow tax deductibility of interest for landlords, which is replaced by the land value tax.
 Require a deposit of 100% of the value of an existing home when purchased for investment purposes.
 Return the GST on new residential builds back to the local councils to fund further infrastructure development.
 Establish a $3 billion development fund for Community Housing Associations with the goal of clearing the public housing waiting list within its first 3 years of operation.
 Support more urban densification for central cities and transit nodes. Councils will be required to demonstrate that they have enough land zoned for new residential housing in line with the NPS-UD and MDRS.

Climate Policy 

 Support the shift to public transport, e-bikes and electric vehicles through targeted subsidies, more affordable fares and long-term investment.
 Support a rapid introduction of the National Adaptation Plan.
 Support the preservation of local ecosystems
 Support farming initiatives such as planting riverbanks and erosion-prone land.

History

Foundation

The Opportunities Party was founded by economist and philanthropist Gareth Morgan in November 2016. Morgan launched the party on 4 November outside Parliament House in Wellington. On 10 January 2017 the party announced that it had 2,000 members and was applying for registration. It also announced that it was considering standing electorate candidates. The Electoral Commission posted notice of the registration application on 21 January.

The party announced that then party chief of staff Geoff Simmons would contest the Mount Albert by-election on 25 February 2017. During the by-election the party was criticised by David Seymour for offering free rides for Mount Albert voters, which he asserted breached the Electoral Act. However, the Electoral Commission cleared TOP of any wrongdoing. Simmons received 623 votes (4.56% of the total vote), placing him third.

2017 general election

The party was registered by the Electoral Commission on 6 March 2017. On 24 May 2017, Gareth Morgan announced the party's first four electoral and list candidates for the general election on 23 September 2017, and announced further candidates in the following months including former Green Party candidate Teresa Moore who joined Geoff Simmons as co-deputy leader. TOP's final list had 26 party list candidates of which 21 were also contesting electorates.

TOP took TVNZ to court after being excluded from its televised election debates, but lost the case. Leader Gareth Morgan faced controversy during the campaign for referring to Labour leader Jacinda Ardern as "lipstick on a pig", suggesting that the new leader had style but not substance. Morgan also faced backlash when he criticised the public for being sad over the death of Jacinda Ardern's cat. This backlash included an email from TOP candidate Jenny Condie, who said, "It is not merely Gareth’s comments themselves – these are a reflection of the culture that exists within the party. There is a mismatch between our policies and our culture: between what we say we want to accomplish and how we actually behave." In response, Morgan told Condie to resign from the party.

At the 2017 general election, TOP gained 2.4% of the vote and won no seats in the New Zealand House of Representatives. Morgan vowed to continue fighting for a "fairer New Zealand" and maintained that TOP was not a failure since it was the fifth most popular party.

Post election developments 
In December 2017, three months after the election, Gareth Morgan resigned as leader and the party's deputy leader Geoff Simmons and two candidates also stepped down from their roles. Morgan said the party would contest the 2020 election but he would not lead it.

In the week that followed the resignations, candidates Jessica Hammond Doube and Jenny Condie announced the launching of a splinter group from TOP with the placeholder name "Next Big Thing". Both candidates attributed their low list rankings to their having raised questions over Morgan's controversial remarks during the election campaign. Condie would become a councillor for Wellington in 2019, while Jessica Hammond would return to TOP for the 2020 election, after a culture shift within the party during its rebuilding phase.

On 9 July 2018, Morgan announced that the Board of The Opportunities Party had decided to cancel the party's registration since the party lacked the time and resources to contest the 2020 general election. In late July, Morgan and the party's board announced that he would reconsider his decision to cancel the party's registration after receiving expressions of interest from people sympathetic to the party's goals. Morgan also indicated in a Facebook post that he was willing to fund candidates and leaders sympathetic to the goals of The Opportunities Party.

In August 2018, The Opportunities Party appointed a new board and Geoff Simmons was appointed interim leader. The new team embarked on a "Listening Tour" across the country to gauge supporter reaction and future interest.

In December 2018, an internal leadership election was run by digital voting company Horizon State. The candidates for leader were Geoff Simmons, Donna Pokere-Phillips, Amy Stevens, Anthony Singh, and Jessica Hammond-Doube. An election was also held for the member-representative to the Board. On 8 December 2018, the board announced that Geoff Simmons had been elected and that Donna Pokere-Phillips had won the race for Member Representative.

2020 general election 

 
After gathering enough support to restart the party and continuing to register with the Electorate Commission, a rebrand and relaunch was held in October 2019. In the brand launch speech, leader Geoff Simmons called for a universal basic income and advances in environment and housing, and to "break the Labour / National duopoly".

TOP nominated candidates in multiple electorates. The Ōhāriu electorate was a particular focus: their Ōhāriu candidate Jessica Hammond Doube said that TOP intended to pour resources into that campaign, as it was the only seat that the party believed it could win. However, she lost the seat to incumbent representative Greg O'Connor by 18,494 votes. Receiving 4,443 votes herself, she came third.

Simmons himself contested Rongotai and came fourth with 3,387 electorate votes out of 45,649 cast. At the beginning of his campaign for the seat Simmons spelled the name of the electorate incorrectly in his advertising as "Rongatai".

The party won 43,449 party votes in the election, or 1.5% of the total. During the party's AGM held on 3 November 2020,  the first after the preliminary results had been released, Geoff Simmons resigned as leader and Shai Navot became interim leader.

On 27 January 2022, former Christchurch City Councillor and independent candidate for Ilam, Raf Manji, was announced as the party's third leader.

2022 local elections 

The party fielded four candidates in the 2022 local elections, the first time they had contested them. With the final votes tallied, the party had its first elected representative in John Dennison who won a seat on the Featherston Community Board in the South Wairarapa District.

Logo 
The party initially used a variant of the Wā kāinga / Home flag as its logo. In a November 2016 blog post, Gareth Morgan noted it had won the Morgan Foundation's flag competition in 2016 and that it symbolised "the transition we currently have underway in Aotearoa". The creators of the Red Peak flag criticised the party for using a logo similar to their flag without discussing it with them. TOP attempted to register this as their logo in January 2017 at the same time as the party; the party was registered in March 2017 but approval of the logo was deferred due to a by-election in March.

The party then changed to a logo consisting of the letters, T, O, and P in black, red, and dark blue respectively. The party applied to register this with the Electoral Commission in April 2017 and it was approved in May 2017. In October 2019, the party updated its website, including a new logo. This logo shows a T, O, P, and full stop; the T and P are in black and the O and full stop are the same colour, though that colour varies from use to use. The logo can appear with a slogan "Vote Different", in a typewriter font. This new logo was registered in February 2020. In the run up to the 2020 New Zealand general election, the party changed the slogan beneath its logo from "Vote Different" to "A Vote For Change".

Electoral results

Officeholders

Leader

Deputy leader

Notable candidates
Tuariki Delamere (born 1951), former Minister of Immigration, Minister of Pacific Island Affairs, Associate Minister of Finance, and Associate Minister of Health. Delamere has been a candidate from 2020 to the present.
Abe Gray (born 1982), founder of the Whakamana Cannabis Museum, high-profile cannabis activist and protester for almost two decades. Gray has been a candidate from 2017 to the present.
Mika Haka (born 1962), Māori singer, performance artist, actor, filmmaker, TV producer and comedian. Haka was a candidate for the 2017 election campaign.
Jessica Hammond (born 1978/1979), public servant, politician, playwright, and blogger. Hammond has been a candidate from 2017 to the present.

References

External links
 

 
Centrist parties in New Zealand
Political parties in New Zealand
Political parties established in 2016
2016 establishments in New Zealand
Political parties supporting universal basic income